Roland Gutierrez may refer to:

 Roland Gutierrez (musician), keyboardist and music producer
 Roland Gutierrez (politician), member of the Texas Senate